

82001–82100 

|-id=071
| 82071 Debrecen ||  || Debrecen is the second largest city in Hungary and the regional center and capital of Hajdú-Bihar county. Kossuth University is located there. The Debrecen Heliophysical Observatory of the Hungarian Academy of Sciences evolved from the Kossuth educational observatory in 1958 || 
|-id=092
| 82092 Kalocsa ||  || Kalocsa, Hungary, birthplace of the second discoverer || 
|}

82101–82200 

|-id=153
| 82153 Alemigliorini ||  || Alessandra Migliorini (born 1978), Italian researcher at the National Institute for Astrophysics (INAF) in Rome, has dedicated years of activity to search for Trojans of the giant planets on digital archives for the Astrovirtel survey, and to discover near-Earth objects. She is also studying the icy moons of Saturn, using data from the Cassini-Huygens instruments. || 
|}

82201–82300 

|-id=232
| 82232 Heuberger || 2001 JU || Robert Heuberger (1922–2021) and his wife Ruth (1924–2016), Swiss entrepreneurs and friends of the discoverer Markus Griesser || 
|}

82301–82400 

|-id=332
| 82332 Las Vegas ||  || Las Vegas, Nevada, in honor of its centennial (1905–2005) || 
|-id=346
| 82346 Hakos ||  || Hakos is a farm and the location of the IAS Observatory  in Namibia, Africa. It is owned by the Internationale Amateur Observatory (IAS), a non-profit society, facilitating access to large telescopes under optimal skies, both for visual observations and astrophotography (Src). || 
|-id=361
| 82361 Benitoloyola ||  || Benito Loyola (born 1961) is a retired US Navy Captain Naval Aviator and graduate of the US Naval Academy, who developed award-winning 3-D modeling and simulation technologies. He is an amateur astronomer currently engaged in a NASA-Hampton University Jupiter-asteroid impact detection project. || 
|}

82401–82500 

|-id=463
| 82463 Mluigiaborsi ||  || Maria Luigia Borsi (born 1973), an Italian opera singer. A lyric soprano, she has performed in major opera houses around the world and is known especially for interpreting operas by Puccini and Verdi. || 
|-id=464
| 82464 Jaroslavboček ||  || Jaroslav Boček (born 1947) has worked on the Astronomical Institute of the Czech Academy of Sciences for several decades. He was involved in the European Network for photographing fireballs and his technical skills were crucial for running all-sky cameras on Czech stations of the network. || 
|}

82501–82600 

|-id=559
| 82559 Emilbřezina ||  || Emil Březina (1975–2012) was a Czech amateur astronomer and a longtime associate at the Vsetín Observatory, to which he dedicated most of his time and energy. He was engaged in observing comets, meteors and extreme meteorological events. His other interests included photography, jazz music and mountain hiking. || 
|}

82601–82700 

|-id=638
| 82638 Bottariclaudio ||  || Claudio Bottari (born 1960), a long-time Italian amateur astronomer since 1980 and was among the first to use CCDs in the Italian amateur community in 1991. At the Mira observatory he uses a 0.6-m concentric Schmidt-Cassegrain in search of supernovae and near-Earth objects. He discovered SN 1996ai in NGC 5005. || 
|-id=656
| 82656 Puskás ||  || Ferenc Puskás (1927–2006), Hungarian football player whose legendary left foot scored 349 goals for Budapesti Honvéd in 358 major-league football matches and 324 goals for Real Madrid. His 83 goals (in 84 matches) remain a record for any player in an international event, and he scored in Hungary's final loss to Germany during the 1954 World Cup. || 
|}

82701–82800 

|-bgcolor=#f2f2f2
| colspan=4 align=center | 
|}

82801–82900 

|-id=896
| 82896 Vaubaillon ||  || Jeremie Vaubaillon (born 1976), a French astronomer working at IMCCE, Observatoire de Paris. || 
|}

82901–83000 

|-id=926
| 82926 Jacquey ||  || Anne-Marie Jacquey, French treasurer of the Société astronomique de Montpellier and a member of the Observatoire des Pises minor planet observing team. She also played an active role in the establishment and development of the observatory. || 
|-id=927
| 82927 Ferrucci ||  || Francesco Ferruccio (1489–1530) was the hero who, at the head of the Florentine army, fought and died for the independence of the republic of Florence in the Battle of Gavinana. || 
|-id=937
| 82937 Lesicki ||  || Andrzej Lesicki (born 1950) is a cellular biologist working at Adam Mickiewicz University in Poznań, Poland. From his position as Rector of the university, he has actively supported asteroid research at the university's observatory and helped to develop a computer cluster that is used for modeling asteroids from their lightcurves. || 
|}

References 

082001-083000